The men's team parallel bars was the first of eight gymnastics events on the Gymnastics at the 1896 Summer Olympics programme. It was held on 9 April. Three teams took part, one German and two Greek. The German team won the competition.

Background

This was the only appearance of the event, which was one of two team apparatus events contested at the 1896 Games (along with a team horizontal bar competition).

Competition format

There were 10 sets of parallel bars made available to the teams. However, there was apparently no limit on the size of the teams, as one team exceeded 30 members. Judges scored the routines on execution, rhythm, and technical difficulty.

Schedule

The men's team parallel bars was held in the afternoon of the fourth day of events. It was the second event of the afternoon, following the 800 metres (which began at 2:30 p.m.).

Results

References

Sources
  (Digitally available at )
  (Excerpt available at )
 

Men's z team parallel bars
Team 1896